Lino Grava (born 5 March 1927 in Vittorio Veneto; died 18 January 2010 in Città Sant'Angelo) was an Italian professional football player.

Honours
 Serie A champion: 1952/53.

1927 births
2010 deaths
Italian footballers
Serie A players
A.C. Milan players
Torino F.C. players
Inter Milan players
A.C. Monza players
Hellas Verona F.C. players
Association football defenders
People from Vittorio Veneto
Footballers from Veneto
Sportspeople from the Province of Treviso